Come Morning We Fight is the second studio album by English alternative rock band Brigade, released on 12 May 2008 on Caned & Able Records.

The band had welcomed Andrew Kearton to join the band as their full-time drummer, and also hired Chris Sheldon (Oceansize, Biffy Clyro, Fightstar) to oversee mixing and producing duties. Brigade set up camp in Monnow Valley Studio's in December 2007 to record songs for their follow up album to Lights.

In early January 2008 Brigade announced that the title for their second album would be Come Morning We Fight. In February, Brigade announced that the first single to be taken off the album would be "Pilot". The full video can now be seen online and on major music video channels. "Pilot" was released on 28 April with the album official release date being on 12 May 2008. The Double A-side "Sink Sink Swim/Stunning" was then released on 4 August.

Rock Sound placed the album at #43 on their "Top 75 Albums of 2008".

Track listing
All lyrics written by Will Simpson; all music composed by Brigade.

"What Are You Waiting For?" – 3:21
"Pilot" – 3:17
"Together Apart" – 3:34
"Res Head" – 3:15
"Stunning" – 2:53
"Slow Dives & Alibis" – 3:34
"Four Kids to a Glockenspiel" – 5:30
"Come Morning We Fight" (Instrumental) – 2:21
"Shortcuts" – 3:36
"Vice to Versa" – 3:30
"Asinine" – 5:17
"Sink Sink Swim" – 3:14
"Boundaries" – 10:18
 contains an untitled hidden track

Release history

Personnel
The following personnel contributed to Come Morning We Fight:

Brigade
 Will Simpson – lead vocals, rhythm guitar
 James Plant – lead guitar, vocals
 Naoto Hori – bass guitar
 Andrew Kearton – drums, percussion

Additional musicians
 Guillermo 'Will' Mayer – string arrangement
 Chris Sheldon – keyboards, backing vocals
 Charlie Simpson – backing vocals
 Edd Simpson – backing vocals
 Tom Hodgkinson – backing vocals

Production
 Chris Sheldon – producer, mixing, engineering
 Steve Fallone – mastering
 Jim Anderson – assistant engineering, art direction, design
 Pete Derrett – photography
 Warren Higgins – A&R

References

2008 albums
Brigade (band) albums
Albums produced by Chris Sheldon